Chelur  is a village in the southern state of Karnataka, India. It is located in the Bagepalli taluk of Chikkaballapur district in Karnataka.

Demographics
 India census, Chelur had a population of 5100 with 2611 males and 2489 females.

See also
 Kolar
 Districts of Karnataka

References

External links
 http://Kolar.nic.in/

Villages in Kolar district
Cities and towns in Chikkaballapur district